is a Japanese basketball player. She competed in the women's tournament at the 1996 Summer Olympics.

References

1972 births
Living people
Japanese women's basketball players
Olympic basketball players of Japan
Basketball players at the 1996 Summer Olympics
Sportspeople from Mie Prefecture
Asian Games medalists in basketball
Asian Games gold medalists for Japan
Asian Games silver medalists for Japan
Basketball players at the 1994 Asian Games
Basketball players at the 1998 Asian Games
Medalists at the 1994 Asian Games
Medalists at the 1998 Asian Games